Spain has many coats of arms: the nation has one, the reigning monarch and the heir presumptive each have one, and there are others for the institutions of state and for Spanish regions and towns.

National

The Royal Family

Institutions

Autonomies

Provinces

Historical

Islands 

Balearic Islands

Canary Islands 
Las Palmas Province

Santa Cruz de Tenerife Province

Comarcas 

Commonwealths of Municipalities

Cities and Notable Towns 

Villa de Madrid 
Present 

Historical

Barcelona
Present 

Historical

Entities

Valencia
Present

Historical

Palma de Mallorca

Present

Historical

Andalusia

Sub-Municipal Entities

Historical

Aragon

Asturias

Balearic Islands

Basque Country

Canary Islands

Cantabria

Castile and León

Exclave within Álava (Basque Country)

Castile-La Mancha

Catalonia

Spanish exclave within France

Historical

Extremadura

Galicia

Community of Madrid

Region of Murcia

Navarre

La Rioja

Valencian Community

Autonomous Cities

Military

Law Enforcement, Rescue and Intelligence 

National Police Corps

Customs Surveillance Service

Head of Government Office Security Department

Autonomous Police Forces

Emergency and Rescue Agencies

Autonomous Communities Rescue Agencies

Prisons

Intelligence Agencies

Royal Academies (Institute of Spain)

Historical coats of arms

See also

List of flags of Spain
Symbols of Francoism

Notes

 
Spanish culture